LH or lh may refer to:

Arts and entertainment
Laurel and Hardy, a comedy double act during the early Classical Hollywood era of American cinema
 "Little Hide", 1998 single by Snow Patrol
Lovehammers, a Chicago-based band
Love Hina, a 1998 popular manga (and anime) series by author Ken Akamatsu
The Lurking Horror, an interactive fiction game released in 1987

Businesses and organizations
Korea Land and Housing Corporation, a South Korean state-owned housing company
LabCorp (stock symbol LH), a clinical laboratory company
Lernout & Hauspie, a former Belgium-based speech and language technology company
Lifehacker, a blog website owned by Gawker Media
Literary and Historical Society (University College Dublin)
Lufthansa (IATA airline designator), large European airline

Places
Le Havre, a French city
Lincoln Highway, in the US
Locks Heath, a suburb of Fareham, UK
County Louth, Ireland (code LH)

Science and technology
 LH, a type of single-mode optical fiber
LH (complexity) (for "logarithmic hierarchy), a computational complexity class
LH (DOS command), a DOS command that loads a program into the upper memory area
Luteinizing hormone, a hormone synthesized and secreted by gonadotropes in the anterior lobe of the pituitary gland
 Windows Longhorn, Development of Windows Vista

Sport
Lethbridge Hurricanes, a WHL hockey team based in Lethbridge, Alberta, Canada
Lewis Hamilton (born 1985), British racing driver

Other uses
lh (digraph), in many languages
Chrysler LH platform, a type of Chrysler car made from 1993 through 2004
Leasehold, or tenure, in property law
Left-handed, or left hand
Letterhead, a heading at the top of a sheet of letter paper
Late Helladic, a period in the history of ancient Greece, during the Bronze Age